Wayne Anthony Allwine (February 7, 1947 – May 18, 2009) was an American voice actor, sound effects editor and foley artist. He is best remembered as the 3rd official voice of Mickey Mouse between 1977 and 2009 (2012 in Mickey Mouse Clubhouse episode releases). He is the longest-tenured actor to voice the character, having held the role for 32 years. He was notably married to Russi Taylor, who voiced Minnie Mouse.

Early life
Allwine was born in Glendale, California, on February 7, 1947. He is a graduate of John Burroughs High School where he acted in various school plays growing up. His father was a barbershop quartet singer.

He played rhythm guitar and even formed his own music ground called the International Singers, were they have performed in many clubs and colleges throughout the state. He briefly toured with the band Davie Allan & the Arrows, including on the 1967 single "Cycle-Delic". He was also an accomplished Dixieland jazz drummer, occasionally sitting in with Firehouse Five Plus Two alumni George Probert's Monrovia Old Style Jazz Band.

Career

In 1966, Allwine started work in the mailing room at the Disney studios, before working in the sound effects department with Jimmy MacDonald.

After working in the sound effects department for seven years, Allwine got a call from Disney for an open audition for the role of Mickey Mouse in late 1976, after a previous actor failed to show up. Upon auditioning for the role, Allwine became the third official voice of Mickey Mouse in 1977. He replaced Jimmy MacDonald, who in 1947 had taken over from Walt Disney himself, who had performed the role since 1928 as well as supplying Mickey's voice for animated portions of the original The Mickey Mouse Club television show (ABC-TV, 1955–1959).

Allwine's first appearance as Mickey was voicing the animated lead-ins for The New Mickey Mouse Club in 1977. His first appearance as Mickey for a theatrical release was in the 1983 featurette Mickey's Christmas Carol. In the same film, he voiced a Santa Claus on the street appealing for charity donations at the start of the movie, Moley (who appears with Ratty) "collecting for the poor", and one of the two weasel undertakers in the Christmas future scene.

He also starred in films such as The Great Mouse Detective (1986), Who Framed Roger Rabbit (1988), The Prince and the Pauper (1990) and Mickey, Donald, Goofy: The Three Musketeers (2004), and the TV series Mickey Mouse Works (1999–2000), Disney's House of Mouse (2001–2003), and Mickey Mouse Clubhouse (2006–2012). He has provided Mickey's voice in the popular Kingdom Hearts series of video games prior to Kingdom Hearts: Birth by Sleep, which was done in collaboration with Japanese video game company Square Enix. Kingdom Hearts 358/2 Days, which was the last game that used his voice (mainly with Mickey as a playable character in Mission Mode), would leave a message in his memory as the game was released in North America several months after his death. 

In addition to his voice work, Allwine had also been a sound effects editor on Disney films and TV shows including Splash (1984) and Three Men and a Baby (1987); as well as Innerspace (1987), Alien Nation (1988), and Star Trek V: The Final Frontier for other studios.

Personal life
In 1991, he married Russi Taylor, who voiced Minnie Mouse from 1986 to 2019, and they were named Disney Legends in 2008, they remained married up until his death in 2009. Allwine also had four children from previous marriages. In addition to his four children, he also had a grandson.

Death
Allwine died of hypertensive crisis caused by complications from acute diabetes at the age of 62 on May 18, 2009, at the Ronald Reagan UCLA Medical Center in Los Angeles. His understudy, Bret Iwan, assumed the role of voicing Mickey Mouse. Allwine is interred at Forest Lawn Memorial Park in Glendale, California.

Filmography

Film

Television

Video games

Theme parks

Crew work

Awards and nominations

References

External links 
 
 

1947 births
2009 deaths
Male actors from Glendale, California
American male video game actors
American male voice actors
Burials at Forest Lawn Memorial Park (Glendale)
Disney people
Male actors from Los Angeles
Primetime Emmy Award winners
Deaths from diabetes
20th-century American male actors
21st-century American male actors